Rajasa was the ruling dynasty of Singhasari kingdom and later Majapahit empire in 13th to 15th century eastern Java. The rulers of Singhasari and Majapahit trace their origins back to the mysterious figure of Ken Arok or Sri Ranggah Rajasa, who founded the Rajasa dynasty early in the 13th century. According to the Pararaton, Ken Arok was born in the Tumapel region (present day Malang, East Java). He was considered as the dynasty founder of both the Singhasari and Majapahit line of monarchs.

In Sanskrit, the term rajasa means either "passion" or "dust"/"soil".

List of rulers

Singhasari period:
 Ken Arok (1222—1227)
 Anusapati (1227—1248)
 Panji Tohjaya (1248)
 Vishnuwardhana-Narasimhamurti (1248—1268)
 Kertanegara (1268—1292)
Majapahit period:
 Raden Wijaya (1294—1309)
 Jayanegara (1309—1328)
 Queen regnant Tribhuwana Wijayatunggadewi (1328—1350)
 Hayam Wuruk (1350—1389)
 Wikramawardhana (1389—1429)
 Queen regnant Suhita (1429—1447)
 Kertawijaya (1447–1451)
 Rajasawardhana (1451–1453), followed by three years of interregnum
 Girishawardhana (1456–1466)
 Suraprabhawa (1466–1474)
 Girindrawardhana (1474–1498)

Family Tree

See also
 List of monarchs of Java
Greater India
Indosphere
Hinduism in Indonesia

References

External links
The Origins of Rajasa Dynasty

Precolonial states of Indonesia
Hindu dynasties
Singhasari
Majapahit
Indonesian families
Rajasa dynasty